Ballybrit is an electoral division and townland in the civil parish of St. Nicholas, on the outskirts of Galway city in Ireland. Evidence of ancient settlement in the area includes a medieval tower house and an earlier ringfort site. The ringfort (or cashel) was used as a graveyard since at least the early 19th century.

See also
 List of townlands of County Galway

References

Townlands of County Galway